Lee Matthew Gronkiewicz (born August 21, 1978) is an American former Major League Baseball relief pitcher who played for the Toronto Blue Jays in 2007. He is the current head coach of the Columbia Blowfish and is also involved with USA baseball on the college national team selection committee.

College career
A native of Los Angeles, California, Gronkiewicz attended Lancaster High School in South Carolina. He started his college baseball career at Spartanburg Methodist College, and then transferred to the University of South Carolina. In 1999, he played collegiate summer baseball with the Falmouth Commodores of the Cape Cod Baseball League. In , he set a school record in saves and was selected to the All-SEC team and was a First-team All-American. He led the country in saves that year and had a 1.42 earned run average.

Minor league career
In 2003, he was recognized as the best relief pitcher in the minor leagues and given the minor leagues' Rolaids Relief Award. He spent four years in Cleveland's minor league system before he was acquired by the Toronto Blue Jays in the  Rule 5 draft. In seven minor-league seasons, Gronkiewicz has a career 18–16 record, pitching almost entirely in relief with just one start for the  Syracuse Sky Chiefs, putting up a 2.48 ERA and a 1.16 WHIP along the way. He struck out nearly four times as many batters as he walked (421 strikeouts and 111 walks through 2007).

Major league career
Gronkiewicz' major league debut (and only major league appearance to date) was on June 19, when the Blue Jays hosted the Los Angeles Dodgers. He allowed one run—a home run to Dodgers catcher Russell Martin—on two hits, walking two and striking out two, over four innings of work. He was on the Major League roster for about a week before being demoted.

In November 2007, he signed as a free agent with the Boston Red Sox.

In April , after a stellar month in Triple-A where he allowed 1 run in 11 innings, he was placed on the DL with elbow soreness. It was later determined to be damage to his UCL and he underwent Tommy John surgery, ending his season. He became a free agent at the end of the season.

References

External links

Sox Prospects statistics and analysis
Lee Gronkiewicz at Pura Pelota] (Venezuelan Professional Baseball League)
 

1978 births
Living people
Akron Aeros players
All-American college baseball players
American expatriate baseball players in Canada
Baseball players from Los Angeles
Buffalo Bisons (minor league) players
Burlington Indians players (1986–2006)
Falmouth Commodores players
Grand Prairie AirHogs players
Indios de Mayagüez players
Kinston Indians players
Leones del Caracas players
American expatriate baseball players in Venezuela
Major League Baseball pitchers
Pawtucket Red Sox players
South Carolina Gamecocks baseball players
Spartanburg Methodist Pioneers baseball players
Syracuse Chiefs players
Syracuse SkyChiefs players
Toronto Blue Jays players
Yaquis de Obregón players
American expatriate baseball players in Mexico